Chan Tseng-hsi (1923 – March 8, 1986) was a China-born entrepreneur who founded the Hong Kong-based real estate company Hang Lung Group.

Born and raised in Kwangtung, China, Chan moved to the British Hong Kong in the 1940s because of the Chinese Civil War. He took an entry-level job in a bank and eventually built a successful real estate business. According to his son Gerald, he used to loan money to his friends to pay for their children's school fees. His mother was a nurse who, in the 1950s, gave cholera vaccinations to the neighbourhood children in the family kitchen.

After Gerald got a fellowship for his doctoral studies at Harvard, Chan was proud of his son, but disturbed that Gerald was taking the place of someone who couldn't pay. He told a friend, "We have the means to pay tuition. Why is Gerald taking the scholarship away from someone else?"

In 2014, his sons Ronnie and Gerald donated $350 million to Harvard University, which named the Harvard T.H. Chan School of Public Health after him. Harvard officials said the money would be used in four areas: pandemics, including obesity, cancer, and the Ebola outbreak in West Africa; harmful environments, including pollution and violence; poverty and humanitarian crises; and failing health systems.

In 2021, the Chan family made an unrestricted gift of $175 million to the UMass Medical School, which changed its name to UMass Chan Medical School in recognition of this donation.

References

1923 births
1986 deaths
People from Foshan
Chinese Civil War refugees
Hong Kong real estate businesspeople
Chinese emigrants to British Hong Kong